Maurice Joseph (born August 26, 1985) is a former Canadian basketball player and coach, currently an assistant coach at Butler. He is the former head coach of the George Washington University Colonials men's basketball team.

Playing career
After a standout prep career at Champlain-St. Lambert in his native Montreal, Joseph committed to play basketball at Michigan State under Tom Izzo. Joseph appeared in 52 games and was a part of two NCAA Tournament squads for the Spartans over a two-year period, averaging 3.8 points per game before transferring to Vermont, closer to his Montreal home. In two seasons with the Catamounts, Joseph was the team's second-leading scorer with 13.9 points per game, helping Vermont to its fourth NCAA Tournament appearance in 2010.

Upon graduation, Joseph played professional basketball in Israel with Hapoel Afula B.C., while also representing the home nation of his parents, Trinidad and Tobago, playing on its national basketball team in 2010.

Coaching career

George Washington
In 2011, Joseph joined his former coach at Vermont, Mike Lonergan, on his staff at George Washington, rising from director of basketball operations to assistant coach. 

In 2017, Joseph was elevated to the interim head coaching position after Lonergan was fired by the school amid reports of verbal player abuse and misconduct. Joseph was confirmed to the head coach position on March 27, 2017, with a 5-year deal with the university. Joseph was one of four Canadian-born NCAA Division I men's basketball head coaches all-time, joining James Naismith, Pete Newell, and Paul Weir. On March 15, 2019 Joseph was fired from George Washington, amassing a 44–57 overall record.

During Joseph's time he coached future NBA players Patricio Garino, Tyler Cavanaugh and Yuta Watanabe.

Fairleigh Dickinson
On August 7, 2019 Joseph was named an assistant coach at Fairleigh Dickinson under Greg Herenda.

George Mason
Joseph was hired to be on Dave Paulsen's staff at George Mason in June, 2020.

Richmond
In May 2021, Chris Mooney added Joseph to his coaching staff at Richmond.

Butler
In May 2022, Thad Matta added Joseph to his coaching staff at Butler.

Personal
Joseph's brother is former NBA player Kris Joseph, a second round selection by the Boston Celtics in the 2012 NBA Draft. He is also the second cousin of Cory Joseph, currently of the Detroit Pistons, as well as Devoe Joseph, a former first-team All-Pac-12 selection at Oregon.

Head coaching record

References

External links
 George Washington profile
 Michigan State profile

1985 births
Living people
Black Canadian basketball players
Canadian men's basketball coaches
Canadian expatriate basketball people in the United States
Canadian sportspeople of Trinidad and Tobago descent
George Mason Patriots men's basketball coaches
George Washington Colonials men's basketball coaches
Fairleigh Dickinson Knights men's basketball coaches
Hapoel Afula players
Michigan State Spartans men's basketball players
Basketball players from Montreal
Richmond Spiders men's basketball coaches
Vermont Catamounts men's basketball players
Guards (basketball)